Virginia Potter Held (born October 28, 1929) is an American moral, social/political and feminist philosopher whose work on the ethics of care sparked significant research into the ethical dimensions of providing care for others and critiques of the traditional roles of women in society.

Beliefs
Held defends care ethics as a moral framework distinct from Kantian, utilitarian and virtue ethics. She holds that care is fundamental to human institutes and practices, indeed to our survival. Tong and Williams quote: "There can be no ju[s]tice without care…for without care no child would survive and there would be no persons to respect."

Held's work on the morality of political violence viewed through the window of ethics of care has also been significantly influential.

Career
Held was named Distinguished Professor at the City University of New York – Graduate Center and Hunter College in 1996.

She received her Ph.D. in philosophy from Columbia University in 1968 and worked at Hunter College as lecturer (1965–69), assistant professor (1969–72), associate professor (1973–77) and full professor from 1977 to her retirement in 2001. Held was affiliated with the CUNY Graduate Center in 1973, and served as deputy executive officer of the Philosophy program at the CUNY Graduate Center from 1980 to 1984. She also served as president of the Eastern Division of the American Philosophical Association in 2001–2002.

Selected works

Books

Chapters in books

Journal articles

Encyclopedia articles

 Feminism and Political Theory in The Blackwell Guide to Social and Political Philosophy

 Rights: Moral and Legal from A Companion to Feminist Philosophy
 Feminist Social and Political Philosophy in Encyclopedia of Philosophy Supplement (1997).
 "Power" in <small>Blackwell Dictionary of Business Ethics</small>
 Mass Media, Moral Pluralism'' in Encyclopedia of Ethics

For further works see C.V.

References

External links
 Virginia Held Papers - Pembroke Center Archives, Brown University

1929 births
20th-century American philosophers
American feminists
American women philosophers
Feminist philosophers
Women's studies academics
Presidents of the American Philosophical Association
Living people
20th-century American women
21st-century American women